Vinnie Tarantola is an American gasser drag racer, the first to win two National Hot Rod Association (NHRA) national titles in the class.

History 
Driving a Chevrolet-powered 1940 Willys gasser, Tarantola won two NHRA national class titles.

His first was in C/GS, at the 1965 NHRA Nationals, at Indianapolis Raceway Park.

Tarantola followed up with a win in CC/G (adding a supercharger to the Chevrolet engine) at Indianapolis in 1966.

Notes

Sources
Davis, Larry. Gasser Wars, North Branch, MN:  Cartech, 2003, pp.184-5.  

Dragster drivers
American racing drivers